Sportforum Chemnitz is a multi-purpose stadium, in Chemnitz, Germany. The capacity of the stadium is 18,500 spectators. It was used as the stadium of Chemnitzer BC and later for home matches of FC Karl-Marx-Stadt. 

(Ernst Thälmann Pioneer Organisation, 1988)

External links
 Stadium information

Football venues in East Germany
Football venues in Germany
Sport in Chemnitz
Sports venues in Saxony
Sports venues completed in 1926